Rui Carlos Pinho da Vitória (born 16 April 1970) is a Portuguese football manager and a former player who played as a midfielder. He is the manager of the Egypt national football team.

He most notably spent three and a half years with Benfica in Portugal, winning seven major trophies, which included two consecutive Primeira Liga titles.

Playing career
Vitória was born in Alverca do Ribatejo, Vila Franca de Xira. During his career, in which he played for five clubs, he never competed in higher than the third division (four seasons), also spending eleven years in the fourth. He mainly represented U.D. Vilafranquense, in the Lisbon area.

A midfielder, Vitória retired as a player in 2003, aged 32.

Managerial career

Early years and Fátima
After starting as a manager with his main team Vilafranquense, Vitória moved in 2004 to Benfica, spending two seasons with its junior side.

In 2006, Vitória signed for Fátima, helping the club promote to the second level in his first season, followed by immediate relegation back. In 2008–09, again as champion, he again led the side to division two.

Paços de Ferreira
On 2 June 2010, Vitória replaced Ulisses Morais at the helm of Paços de Ferreira. In his first season in the top division, he guided the team to the seventh position in the league, also achieving runner-up honours in the domestic League Cup, which was won by Benfica (2–1).

Vitória de Guimarães
In late August 2011, Vitória replaced fired Manuel Machado as the manager of Vitória de Guimarães. In his second year, he led the club to the conquest of the Portuguese Cup against Benfica (2–1), in a first-ever for the Minho Province side. Later, on 10 August 2013, he was runner-up in the Supertaça, losing 3–0 to Porto.

Benfica

On 15 June 2015, Portuguese champions Benfica announced that Vitória had signed a three-year contract with the club. He started the season by losing the Supertaça 1–0 to Lisbon rivals Sporting. Despite a troubled start, Benfica secured a third Primeira Liga title in a row and 35th overall with a 4–1 win over Nacional at the Estádio da Luz on the final matchday, establishing a Portuguese league record of 88 points in 34 matches. Also, with a 1–0 league win at Boavista, Vitória set a Benfica record of 11 consecutive away triumphs in all competitions. Moreover, he also managed the team to the quarter-finals of the UEFA Champions League and to their seventh Taça da Liga trophy, beating Marítimo 6–2. Later that season, he received Primeira Liga's award for Best Coach.

Vitória started the 2016–17 season by winning his first Portuguese Super Cup on his third attempt, with a 3–0 win over Braga; therefore, he succeeded in winning all four major trophies in Portugal. On 23 October 2016, he surpassed Jimmy Hagan's 43-year-old record of 15 consecutive away wins in the league, achieving the 16th as Benfica defeated Belenenses 2–0 away. Later, on 7 April 2017, he renewed his contract for a further two seasons before ending the season with victories in Primeira Liga, Taça de Portugal and Supertaça, therefore, clinching Benfica's second treble in history after Lajos Baróti's in 1980–81. In addition to that, by winning two of four league titles in a row, Vitória became the first Benfica manager to reach the tetra.

The next season, Vitória won the domestic Super Cup and guided Benfica to a second place in Primeira Liga and to the worst Portuguese campaign in the Champions League, which included the club's record loss in the competition, 5–0 to Basel.

On 4 January 2019, following a string of bad results during the 2018–19 season, resulting in Benfica's first-ever loss to Portimonense, Vitória's contract was terminated by the club.

Al-Nassr
Within a week of his departure from Benfica, Vitória was hired on an 18-month contract at Saudi Arabian club Al-Nassr FC, ranked second in the Saudi Professional League. His first match was a 5–0 win over second-tier Al-Ansar F.C. in the last 32 of the King Cup on 14 January 2019. The club from Riyadh finished the season as champions. He later led Al-Nassr to reach the 2020 AFC Champions League semi-finals, where they only lost to Persepolis on penalties.

On 27 December 2020, Vitória left the club by mutual consent. At the time of his departure, Al-Nassr were 15th in the table with 8 points from 10 matches.

Spartak Moscow
On 24 May 2021, Vitória joined Russian Premier League club FC Spartak Moscow on a two-year contract. Zarema Salikhova, wife of then-co-owner Leonid Fedun, resigned from the board due to her disagreement with the decision.

Vitória's record at the club was mixed. He had won their Europa League group ahead of Leiceister City and Napoli, for which he gained popularity amongst the fans. In fact, Spartak beat Napoli both home and away around time when Napoli was first in Serie A. However, the Russian giants were 9th in the league, with a low note being a 7–1 loss to FC Zenit Saint Petersburg. Vitória's contract with Spartak was terminated by mutual agreement on 15 December 2021.

Egypt
On 12 July 2022, Vitória became the manager of the Egyptian national team, signing on a four-year contract.

Managerial statistics

Honours

Managerial
Fátima
Third Division: 2008–09
Vitória Guimarães
Taça de Portugal: 2012–13
Benfica
Primeira Liga: 2015–16, 2016–17
Taça de Portugal: 2016–17
Taça da Liga: 2015–16
Supertaça Cândido de Oliveira: 2016, 2017
Al-Nassr
Saudi Professional League: 2018–19
Saudi Super Cup: 2019

Individual
Primeira Liga – Best Coach: 2015–16, 2016–17
Saudi Professional League Manager of the Month: March 2019, October 2019, August 2020

References
Notes

Citations

External links

 

1970 births
Living people
People from Vila Franca de Xira
Portuguese footballers
Association football midfielders
U.D. Vilafranquense players
F.C. Alverca players
Seixal F.C. players
Casa Pia A.C. players
Segunda Divisão players
Portuguese football managers
C.D. Fátima managers
F.C. Paços de Ferreira managers
Vitória S.C. managers
S.L. Benfica managers
Al Nassr FC managers
FC Spartak Moscow managers
Primeira Liga managers
Saudi Professional League managers
Russian Premier League managers
Portuguese expatriate football managers
Portuguese expatriate sportspeople in Saudi Arabia
Portuguese expatriate sportspeople in Russia
Expatriate football managers in Saudi Arabia
Expatriate football managers in Russia
Sportspeople from Lisbon District
Egypt national football team managers